The 1954–55 season is the 75th season of competitive football by Rangers.

Overview
Rangers played a total of 41 competitive matches during the 1954–55 season.

Results
All results are written with Rangers' score first.

Scottish League Division A

Scottish Cup

League Cup

Appearances

See also
 1954–55 in Scottish football
 1954–55 Scottish Cup
 1954–55 Scottish League Cup

References 

Rangers F.C. seasons
Rangers